Shan United Army (SUA) was a Shan militia group formed by Khun Sa. Originally formed in 1966 as the Loimaw Ka Kwe Ye (anti-communist militia), it changed the name to reflect a Shan nationalist orientation during the 1970s and regrouped in Ban Hin Taek, northern Thailand. In 1985, the group merged with the Tai Revolutionary Council led by Moh Heng to create the Mong Tai Army.

References

Rebel groups in Myanmar
Shan militia groups